Henry William George Paget, 3rd Marquess of Anglesey (9 December 1821 – 30 January 1880), styled Lord Paget until 1854 and Earl of Uxbridge between 1854 and 1869, was a British peer and Liberal politician.

Background
Anglesey was the only son of Henry Paget, 2nd Marquess of Anglesey, by his first wife Eleanora, daughter of Colonel John Campbell.

Political career
Anglesey was returned to Parliament as one of two representatives for Staffordshire South in 1854, a seat he held until 1857. In 1869 he succeeded his father in the marquessate and entered the House of Lords. Apart from his political career he also served in the Grenadier Guards.

Personal life
Lord Anglesey married in 1845 Sophia Eversfield, born 24 June 1819, the daughter of James Eversfield of Denne Park, Sussex and his wife Mary, daughter of Robert Hawgood Crew. There were no children from the marriage. He died at Albert Mansions, Victoria Street, Westminster, London, in January 1880, aged 58, and was succeeded by his half-brother, Lord Henry Paget.

The Marchioness of Anglesey moved to Fordingbridge, Hampshire, and later to Pantiles, Tunbridge Wells, Kent, where she died 7 December 1901.

References

External links 
 

1821 births
1880 deaths
Uxbridge, Henry Paget, Earl of
Uxbridge, Henry Paget, Earl of
UK MPs who inherited peerages
Henry
Grenadier Guards officers
Liberal Party (UK) MPs for English constituencies
Presidents of the Marylebone Cricket Club
3
People from Victoria, London